Macedonia participated at the 2018 Summer Youth Olympics held in Buenos Aires, Argentina from 6 October to 18 October 2018.

Athletics

Judo

Karate

Macedonia qualified one athlete based on the rankings in the Buenos Aires 2018 Olympic Standings.

 Boys' -61 kg - Fahik Vaseli

Swimming

Taekwondo

Wrestling

Key:
  – Victory by Fall
  – Without any point scored by the opponent

References

2018 in Republic of Macedonia sport
Nations at the 2018 Summer Youth Olympics
North Macedonia at the Youth Olympics